La Junta may refer to:

Places in the United States:
La Junta, Colorado, a city in Otero County
La Junta (Amtrak station), train station
La Junta Municipal Airport
La Junta Gardens, Colorado, census-designated place in Otero County

Other uses:
Financial Oversight and Management Board for Puerto Rico, also colloquially known as La Junta.
La Junta Airport, Aysén Region, Chile
La Junta Indians, indigenous people of North America living in the present-day areas of Texas and northern Mexico
La Junta Subdivision, railway line in Kansas and Colorado, United States
Parque la Junta (La Junta Park), baseball field in Nuevo Laredo, Tamaulipas, Mexico